Matouba is a locality in the commune of Saint-Claude in Guadeloupe. It is noted as being the place of death of Louis Delgrès. It is noted for its natural spring which is said to have "miraculous" powers, situated at 742 meters above sea level, within the Guadeloupe National Park. Matouba is used as a base for hiking. It contains the chapelle du Vœu-de-Matouba.

References

Populated places in Guadeloupe